Alessandro Otranto Godano (born 28 July 1997) is an Italian professional footballer who plays as a winger for Serie D club Borgo San Donnino.

Club career
Formed in Crotone youth system, Godano signed for Rende, with which between 2017 and 2020 he made 51 appearances in Serie C with 2 goals and 3 assists.

For the 2020–21 he played for Serie D club Audace Cerignola.

On 29 July 2021, he joined to Fiorenzuola. His contract was terminated by mutual consent on 29 January 2022.

On 1 February 2022, he signed with Serie D club Borgo San Donnino.

References

External links
 
 

1997 births
Living people
People from Crotone
Footballers from Calabria
Italian footballers
Association football midfielders
Serie C players
Serie D players
F.C. Crotone players
Rende Calcio 1968 players
S.S.D. Audace Cerignola players
U.S. Fiorenzuola 1922 S.S. players
Sportspeople from the Province of Crotone